Skepsis was an ancient settlement in Asia Minor.

Skepsis may also refer to:
Skepsis (album), the death metal album by Through the Eyes of the Dead.
Skepsis ry, the Finnish association of skeptics.
Stichting Skepsis, a Dutch skeptics association.
Skepsis Congres, the annual conference organised by Stichting Skepsis.
Skepsis Norge, a Norwegian skeptics association.
Skepsis, a Norwegian magazine published by Skepsis Norge between the 1990s and 2001.

See also
 Skepticism
 Scientific skepticism
 Philosophical skepticism
 Religious skepticism
 Skepter, magazine published by Stichting Skepsis.